Delano Joint Union High School District (DJUHSD) is a public school district based in Kern County, California, United States.

Schools
 Cesar E. Chavez High School
 Delano High School
 Robert F. Kennedy High School
 Valley High School

Other programs:
 Child Development Program
 Delano Adult School

External links
 

School districts in Kern County, California